Helicopter Maritime Strike Squadron 49 (HSM-49) is a United States Navy Maritime Strike helicopter squadron based Naval Air Station North Island, California.

The Scorpions of HSM-49 are an operational fleet squadron based at NAS North Island.  Their tailcode is TX and their radio callsign is "Red Stinger".  The squadron provides combat-ready pilots, aircrewmen, technicians, and aircraft to Pacific Fleet warships.  The squadron operates the MH-60R Seahawk helicopter.

History 

HSM-49 was redesignated on 1 April 2015, formerly being Helicopter Anti-Submarine Squadron Light 49 (HSL-49). HSL-49 was established on 23 March 1990 as the U.S. Navy transitioned the Helicopter Anti-Submarine Light community from the SH-2 Seasprite to the SH-60B Seahawk.

The squadron - then and now - deploys its personnel and aircraft in an expeditionary model.  Detachments are led by an Officer-in-Charge, normally a Lieutenant Commander, and typically deploy with one or two helicopters, and a complement of pilots, Naval Aircrewmen, mechanics and technicians.

Detachments embark Arleigh Burke class destroyers and Ticonderoga class cruisers in support of Carrier Strike Groups (CSG), Surface Action Groups (SAG), or independent deployed operations.  Recent deployed detachments have engaged in missions ranging from Operation Enduring Freedom (OEF), counter-piracy, Humanitarian Assistance and Disaster Relief (HA/DR), and Counter-Illicit Trafficking.

Aircraft 
Crews from HSM-49 operate the MH−60R Seahawk, a helicopter manufactured by Sikorsky Aircraft and equipped with two front-drive T700−GE−401C turboshaft engines manufactured by the General Electric Company.  The helicopter has fixed landing gear, an external cargo hook, a rescue hoist, and bomb racks for carrying and launching external stores.  In addition, it is equipped with a sonobuoy launch system, a Helicopter In−Flight Refueling (HIFR) system, and the necessary avionics and instrumentation for instrument flight and mission accomplishment.  The helicopter can operate from a variety of naval ships.

HSM-49 transitioned from the SH-60B to the MH-60R variant of the Seahawk in the spring of 2015.

Mission 
The MH-60R is designed to combine the features of the legacy SH-60B and SH-60F airframes. The aircraft includes an Aircraft Survivability Equipment (ASE) package, FLIR, multi-mode radar/IFF interrogator, airborne fleet data link, and a more advanced airborne active sonar. It is not equipped with the Magnetic Anomaly Detection (MAD) that the SH-60B employed. Pilot instrumentation is provided by a glass cockpit, using digital monitors instead of dials and gauges.

Primary Missions 
In an Anti-Submarine Warfare (ASW) role, Scorpion aircrews use radar, Electronic Support Measures (ESM), sonobuoys, and ship sensors to localize, classify, track, and if necessary attack when a submarine has been detected.  Aircraft can be equipped with various different torpedoes for the mission.

In an Anti-Surface Warfare (ASuW) role, Scorpion aircrews observe, identify, and localize threat platforms using radar, ESM, and FLIR.  When a suspected threat is detected, data can be provided to the parent ship for surface−to−surface weapon engagement.  Aircraft equipped with Hellfire missiles (AGM-114) may conduct independent or coordinated attacks.  The MH-60R can also be equipped with the GAU-21 (.50 caliber) and M240D (7.62 mm) crew served machine guns.

Other enhanced capabilities include an ASE package, FLIR, multi-mode radar/IFF interrogator, airborne fleet data link, and an advanced airborne active sonar.

Secondary Missions 
Vertical Replenishment - In the VERTREP mission, the aircraft is able to transfer material between ships, or between ship and shore.

Search and Rescue - In the SAR mission, the aircraft is designed to search for and locate a particular target/object/ship or plane and to rescue personnel using the rescue hoist.

Medical Evacuation - In the MEDEVAC mission, the aircraft provides for the medical evacuation of patients.

Communications Relay - In the COMREL mission, the aircraft relays communications between units.

Naval Surface Fire Support - In the NSFS mission, the aircraft provides a platform for spotting and controlling naval gunfire from surface ships.

Unit awards

See also 
Naval aviation
List of United States Navy aircraft designations (pre-1962) / List of US Naval aircraft
United States Naval Aviator
List of United States Navy ratings
Military aviation
List of United States Navy aircraft squadrons
List of Inactive United States Navy aircraft squadrons

References 

NATOPS Flight Manual Navy Model SH-60B Helicopter, A1-H60BB-NFM-000, 1 June 2012.  (Unclassified, for official use (FOUO) or administrative, or operational purposes only.  Requests for the document shall be referred to the Commander, Naval Air Systems Command (PMA-299), 47123 Buse Road, Bldg 2272, Patuxent River, MD, 20670-1547.)
Naval Historical Center Website for HSL Squadron Insignia

External links
HSL-49 Scorpions Website
HSL-49 Scorpions Past and Present Facebook page

Military units and formations in California
Helicopter anti-submarine squadrons of the United States Navy